Mitko Plahov (born 12 February 1993)  is a Bulgarian footballer who currently plays as a midfielder for Botev Galabovo.

Career

Haskovo
Plahov is youth player of Haskovo and played in A Group with the team in the 2014–15 season.

Vereya
On 11 July 2015 he signed with the Bulgaria B Group team Vereya Stara Zagora coming from Haskovo. He made his professional debut for the league on 25 July 2015 in a 4:0 win against Septemvri Simitli.

Arda Kardzhali
On 21 June 2017, after a season in Etar Veliko Tarnovo, he joined Third League club Arda Kardzhali.

Career statistics

Club

References

External links
 

1993 births
Living people
Bulgarian footballers
Association football midfielders
First Professional Football League (Bulgaria) players
FC Haskovo players
FC Vereya players
SFC Etar Veliko Tarnovo players
FC Arda Kardzhali players
FC Botev Galabovo players
People from Haskovo
Sportspeople from Haskovo Province